Leimistin Broussan (3 November 1858 – 1 October 1959) was a French theatre and opera manager.

Life 
Born in Vauvert (Gard department), Broussan successively directed the municipal theatre of Brest (1898-1899), the municipal theatre of Nancy (1899-1902) then the Théâtre des Célestins and the Grand Théâtre de Lyon (1902-1906), before becoming co-director, with André Messager, of the Paris Opera from 1908 to 1914.

He married Madeleine Lagarde, daughter of Paul Lagarde (1851-1903) and Jeanne Samary.

Broussan died in Paris on 1 October 1959.

Awards 
 Chevalier of the  Légion d'honneur
 Officier of the Ordre des Palmes Académiques
 Commandeur of the Order of Saint Anna
 Commandeur of the Order of the Polar Star
 Commandeur of the Order of Leopold

Sources 
 , L'Opéra de Paris, 1989

External links 

1858 births
1959 deaths
People from Gard
Opera managers
Chevaliers of the Légion d'honneur
Officiers of the Ordre des Palmes Académiques
Recipients of the Order of St. Anna
Commanders of the Order of the Polar Star
Directors of the Paris Opera
French centenarians
Men centenarians